Church with Chapel Brampton is a civil parish in West Northamptonshire, England. The two main settlements are Church Brampton and Chapel Brampton (sometimes known as The Bramptons). The population of the parish was 808 at the 2011 census.

This civil parish is part of the ecclesiastical benefice of 'Brington with Whilton and Norton and Church Brampton with Chapel Brampton and Harlestone and East Haddon and Holdenby'.

In 2022, research published by Savills reported that the parish was the most desired place to live in Northamptonshire and one of the most desired in the UK. In 2021, Golf Lane in Church Brampton was named the most expensive street in Northamptonshire.

References

External links 

Church with Chapel Brampton Parish Council contact details
 A Tale of Two Villages: A Perambulation of Church with Chapel Brampton by Jack Wagstaff, a long-time resident of Chapel Brampton

 Civil parishes in Northamptonshire